Marinus Jan Granpré Molière (Oudenbosch, 13 October 1883 – Wassenaar, 13 February 1972) was a Dutch architect. His work was part of the architecture event in the art competition at the 1924 Summer Olympics.

Granpré Molière was a professor at the Delft University of Technology and was seen as founder of the Traditionalist School.  Molière initiated numerous urban projects, such as the Wieringermeer (from 1927) and the North East Polder (from 1937).

References

Publications 
 J.A. Kuiper: Visueel & dynamisch. De stedebouw van Granpré Molière en Verhagen 1915–1950. Delft, 1991
 Woorden en werken van Prof. Ir. Granpré Molière. Heemstede,  1949

External links 

 Archives of Marinus Jan Granpré Molière
 J.A. Kuiper: Visueel & dynamisch. De stedebouw van Granpré Molière en Verhagen 1915–1950. Delft, 1991
 Cubra

1883 births
1972 deaths
Dutch architects
Dutch ecclesiastical architects
Academic staff of the Delft University of Technology
People from Halderberge
Olympic competitors in art competitions